Ivar Lykke (9 January 1872, Trondheim – 4 December 1949, Trondheim) was a Norwegian politician from the Conservative Party, who served as the 17th prime minister of Norway from 1926 to 1928. He was also president of the Storting from 1919 to 1927.

World War Two
Lykke was a member of the parliament's presidium in 1940; he stepped in (according to mandate) for president in exile, C. J. Hambro.

On 27 June 1940 Lykke, and others of parliament's presidium, signed an appeal to King Haakon, about [the desire for] his abdication. (The presidium back then consisted of the presidents and vicepresidents of parliament, Odelstinget and Lagtinget.)

1945
After World War Two, he and others were criticized (for actions in 1940) by a parliamentary fact-finding commission.

Visit by King Haakon
By 1947 he was still being treated for cancer.

During King Haakon's visit that year to Trondheim, he diverged from his official program to visit Lykke. Lykke said "Thou can believe that we had it difficult here in Norway in the summer of 1940". The king replied, "That is exactly why I am coming to You, dear Ivar Lykke", and stretched forward his hand" [for greeting].

References

1872 births
1949 deaths
Prime Ministers of Norway
Leaders of the Conservative Party (Norway)
Presidents of the Storting